Megan Gailey is an American stand-up comedian, actress and podcast host. She released a comedy album, My Dad Paid for This.

Career 

Gailey has also appeared on The Tonight Show Starring Jimmy Fallon, Conan and @midnight. She was selected as a "New Face" at the Montréal Just for Laughs festival in 2015. She has written for the 2017 ESPY Award. She was an official performer at SXSW.

Filmography

Personal life
Gailey is married to comedian, writer and sports podcast host C.J. Toledano.

References

External links
 
 

American stand-up comedians
21st-century American comedians
American television actresses
American women comedians
Living people
21st-century American women
1986 births